Rezaabad (also Romanized as Reẕāābād; also known as Rizā‘ābād) is a village in Ahmadabad Rural District, Hasanabad District, Eqlid County, Fars Province, Iran. At the 2006 census, its population was 673, in 145 families.

References 

Populated places in Eqlid County